Shakeeb Dallal (1920–1992) was born in the city of Tulkarm, Palestine. He was a Palestinian politician and Commander, and Of the members and leaders of the Palestine Liberation Organization. the son of Jamil H. Dallal, who was active in the 1936 Arab Uprising against the British Mandate.

Political and military life 
Shakeeb Dallal was one of the founders of Ba'ath party and was a member of the PLO and a member of its PNC, the Palestinian National Council.  In his younger years, he was an important participant in the Palestine Arab Workers Society, led by Sami Taha, and played a significant role in expanding the Society, especially in the Nablus, Jenin and Tulkarm areas.

Military battles 
He led The Great Battle of Beit Shean in 1947, and he was wounded During it.

Death 
He died in 1992 in Amman, Jordan.

References

1920 births
1992 deaths
Palestinian militant commanders
Palestinian military personnel
Palestine Liberation Organization members
People from Tulkarm
Palestinian Arab nationalists
Palestinian nationalists
Palestinian trade unionists
Members of the Palestinian National Council